Sarband (also Romanized as Sar-e Band; also known as Sarāhband and Sar Rāh Band) is a village in Kuh Panah Rural District, in the Central District of Tafresh County, Markazi Province, Iran. At the 2006 census, its population was 155, in 55 families.

References 

Populated places in Tafresh County